Puliyannoor Mahadeva Temple is a Hindu temple. It is located in Puliyannoor in Mutholy panchayath and near Pala in Kottayam district in the Indian state of Kerala. it is commonly known as 'Cheruthil Valuthu Puliyannoor' (big among the small). The Namboothiri families known as 'Puliyannoor Oorayma Temple Devaswom' administer the temple.

Deity 
The temple is dedicated to Lord Shiva. Ganapathi, Yogeeswara, Sastha, Nāga, Krishna, Devi and Yakshiyamma are the subordinate deities.

History 
The temple was built by a person named 'Chathamplackal (Nalonnil) Chonar Chettiar'.

Festivals 
The annual festival is hosted in the Malayalam month of 'Kumbham' (i.e. February/March) for eight days. Apart from the annual festival, Vishu, Navratri, Mandala - Makaravilakku and Maha Shivarathri are other important festivals.

References 

Hindu temples in Kottayam district
Shiva temples in Kerala

ml:പുലിയന്നൂർ മഹാദേവക്ഷേത്രം